This is a list of The Best Show with Tom Scharpling episodes hosted by Tom Scharpling. With some exceptions, episodes tend to feature an in-character phone call from Jon Wurster.

List of WFMU-era Best Show episodes

2000

2001

2002

2003

2004

2005

2006

2007

2008

2009

2010

2011

2012

2013

List of Independent-era Best Show episodes

2014

2015

2016

2017

2018

2019

2020

Bonus podcasts 
On Fridays, an additional Best Show-related podcast is released.

The Half Hour of Power 
The Half Hour of Power is an overtime show recorded every other week directly following The Best Show.  It features many fast-paced unscreened phone calls.

Best Show Bests 

Best Show Bests is a 'best of' show featuring clips of The Best Show, often of Jon Wurster calls.

Meet My Friends The Friends 
A Friends re-cap podcast released on most weekdays and hosted by Tom Scharpling. Featuring engineer Jason "Dudio" Gore and Pat Byrne.

Additional shows

The Best Show Patreon Subscriber Podcasts 

The Best Show Patreon Subscriber Podcasts have been provided to those who have made a monthly donation of $5 (USD) or more to the show on patreon.com.

Best Show Gems 

Best Show Gems was a bi-weekly best of podcast that ran concurrently with The Best Show on WFMU from 2009 to 2013. Best Show Bests has since taken its place.

References

External links 
Official website

Lists of radio series episodes